Galaxy Trucker is a science-fiction board game for two to four players. The game was developed by Vlaada Chvatil, with graphics designed by Radim Pech. The Czech version of the game was released in 2007 by Czech Games Edition, and a German version was published in the same year by Heidelberger Spieleverlag. In 2021, revised edition of this game was released.

Vlaada Chvatil developed a video game version in 2014. It was released on 7 October 2014 for iPad, on 24 December 2014 for iPhone and Android and on 14 April 2015 for Windows Phone.

Game Description
Corporation Incorporated is a construction firm that builds sewer systems and low-income houses on under-developed planets. Galaxy Corp Inc. has been on the verge of bankruptcy which has resulted in the company transporting building materials to the edge of the Galaxy, where the need for their services is highest. Corporation Incorporated was saved by a few individuals who decided to not ship the materials to the edge of Galaxy and instead build the materials into spacecraft and let them ship themselves.
The players now just sign a contract, and then gain access to Corp Inc. Warehouse. The player can build their own space ship from the available prefabricated materials and fly it to the Periphery (edge of the Galaxy). The player may lose money, but any gains made are theirs to keep, and Corporation Incorporated will pay a bonus for quick delivery.
It’s possible that the player will end up with an immense amount of debt and end up begging for money on the street or they may just might find themselves among the 10 billion richest people in the Galaxy.

Gameplay
The game is played in three (or up to four with expansions) rounds with later rounds having bigger ships but more difficult travel. Each round consists of three phases: building, space travel, settlement. Before every round, four decks of card are prepared (3 public and 1 secret) and Evil machinations cards from expansion could be added.

Building phase
Main phase of the game where players will construct their ship. In the beginning, all tiles are face down and all players are picking and building simultaneously. Hourglasses keep players under time pressure as faster building players can limit time available. A player who builds at least one tile can pick a public deck to check the dangers ahead.

Flight 
All decks are shuffled together and played one by one by the leading player. Cards contains both positive and negative effects (meteor showers, planets with goods, battlezones, slavers, pirates) that can bring money and goods or remove pieces of ship (that must be repaid) or even force a player to return home.

Settlement 
After flight, players receive bonuses for fastest delivery or the nicest ship and can sell goods. Also they have to settle payments for lost tiles.

Expansions

The Big Expansion (2008)  
This expansion adds new features:
 new ship designs (1A ship and 2A fleet) and ship parts (like shield or laser boosters)
 5 player support
 new Adventure cards
 Evil machinations cards - optional player-selectable cards that allows more customized deck 
 Rough Roads Ahead cards to increase difficulty
 Blue aliens race with unique roles like diplomat or lawyer

Another Big Expansion (2012)
 fourth round
 new ships designs
 2B - cylindrical ship with no sides (border parts are connected)
 3B - Amoeba - ship with holes depending on dice cast before the build phase
 4 - big ship or fleet made by combining of the two boards (back-side of 2B and 3B) with final shape decided during build phase
 new Adventure cards with boarding parties and new ship components like Armory or Security Stations to stop them
 support crew

Latest Models (2013)  
Small expansion based on new ship designs.
 1C/2C - two designs sharing the same board with space-time anomaly in the middle
 3C - death star design (square board with parts connected over the edges)
 4C - combines board with back-sides of 1C/2C and 3C - ship or fleet with final topology dependent on dice cast during building

Missions (2015)  
Small expansion based on missions introduced by the digital versions. Expansion contains mission cards and special tiles (like radioactive cargo or metal ingots).

Video game (2014)
The version for iPad was released in October 2014, with releases for iPhone and Android following in December 2014 and for Windows Phone in April 2015. Game offers a big campaign, solo game or multiplayer.  Expansion Alien technologies was released in August 2016, game added more features like new tiles, Blue aliens or new game mode.

Gameplay
The game features two Phases - the Ship building and Space Travel. The Player builds Ship from junk to get ready for trip as best as he can. Like the board game, players are building the ship in realtime but there is possibility to choose turn-based mode similar to the original game. The second phase is the trip. Player has to gain highest score by getting to the destination before his rivals or by getting more valuable goods. It is possible to play Single-player or Multi-player. The game also features a story campaign.

Reception
The game has received very positive reviews. It currently holds 87% on Metacritic and gained some Awards including the best Czech video game of the year by Games.cz and Readers Choice by Board Game Geek.

Awards & Nominations
 2012 Ludoteca Ideale Winner
 2009 Lys Passioné Finalist
 2009 Japan Boardgame Prize Voters' Selection Nominee
 2008 Spiel des Jahres Recommended
 2008 Spiel der Spiele Hit mit Freunden Recommended
 2008 Hra roku Nominee
 2008 Golden Geek Best Party Board Game Nominee
 2008 Golden Geek Best Gamer's Board Game Nominee
 2008 Golden Geek Best Family Board Game Nominee
 2008 Golden Geek Best Board Game Artwork/Presentation Nominee

References

External links

Board games introduced in 2007
Czech Games Edition games
Science fiction board games
Czech board games
2014 video games
Android (operating system) games
IOS games
Science fiction video games
Video games developed in the Czech Republic
Windows Phone games